Nitto or Nittō or variant may refer to:

 Nitto Boseki, Tokyo-based manufacturer of textile and fiberglass products
 Nitto Denko, corporation producing insulators, tapes, films, LCDs; sponsor of the year-end ATP Finals tennis championship.
 Nitto Tire, tire company bought by Toyo
 Nitto Records, Japanese record company
 Nittō Aviation, predecessor to Japan Domestic Airlines
 Nitto, Japanese model manufacturer, see List of model car brands
 nittō guhō junreikōki, Japanese name of the Ennin's Diary

People
 Frank Nitti, aka Francesco Raffaele Nitto (1886–1943), a mafia enforcer

See also 
 Nitty (disambiguation)
 Nitti (disambiguation)
 Nitta (disambiguation)